The Virgin Islands national basketball team are the basketball players who represent the U.S. Virgin Islands in international competitions.

Tournament record

Pan American Games
 1971 – 11th place
 1975 – 10th place
 1979 – 10th place
 1987 – 10th place
 2007 – 8th place

FIBA AmeriCup
 2001 – 7th place
 2003 – 10th place
 2007 – 10th place
 2009 – 10th place
 2017 – 4th place
 2022 – 12th place

Central American Championship
 1997 – 5th place
 1999 – 6th place
 2001 – 4th place
 2003 – 4th place
 2006 – 2nd place
 2008 – 2nd place
 2010 – 9th place
 2012 – 7th place
 2014 – 6th place

FIBA CBC Championship
2000 – 2nd place
2002 – 1st place
2004 – 6th place
2006 – 2nd place
2011 – 1st place
 2014 – 3rd place
 2015 – 1st place

Players

Current roster
Roster for the 2022 FIBA AmeriCup.

Past roster
The roster for the 2017 FIBA AmeriCup.

 

<noinclude>

Other players
 

<noinclude>

Jason Edwin (196–G/F–81) 
Frank Elegar (206–C–86) 
Akeem Francis (198–F–83) 
Kaylen Gregory (190–G/F–86) 
Jameel Heywood (198–F–77) 
Steven Hodge (180–G–80) 
Carl Krauser (188–G–81) 
Omari Peterkin (203–F/C–83) 
Kitwana Rhymer (208–C–78) 
Ja Ja Richards (207–C–75) 
Kevin Sheppard (182–G–79)

Head coach position
 Milton Barnes (2010–2014)
 Sam Mitchell (2015–2018)
 William Colón (2018–present)

References

External links
FIBA Profile
Latinbasket.com - U.S. Virgin Islands Men National Team

Men's national basketball teams
basketball
1964 establishments in the United States Virgin Islands
Basketball teams established in 1964
Basketball in the United States Virgin Islands